Vereshchagino is a town and the administrative center of Vereshchaginsky District in Perm Krai, Russia, located  west of Perm, the administrative center of the krai. As of the 2010 Census, its population was 22,156.

History
The town was founded as a settlement near the station in 1898. In 1899, the station was given the name of Ocherskaya. In 1904, it was renamed Voznesenskaya, after the name of a nearby volost center.

The modern name is associated with the fact that in 1904 the war artist Vasily Vereshchagin allegedly stopped on his way to the Far East, where he died in April 1904, when the battleship Petropavlovsk was sunk by a mine. Twelve years later, at the request of the inhabitants, the Voznesenskaya station was renamed in honour of the painter.

In the city there is a monument to V.V. Vereshchagin (pictured).

On January 1, 1924, the Vereshchagino settlement became a village and district centre of the same name. It was given city status on June 19, 1942.

Administrative and municipal status
Within the framework of administrative divisions, Vereshchagino serves as the administrative center of Vereshchaginsky District, to which it is directly subordinated. As a municipal division, the town of Vereshchagino, together with ten rural localities, is incorporated within Vereshchaginsky Municipal District as Vereshchaginskoye Urban Settlement.

Economy
Food industry, production of knitwear, manufacture of spare parts and reinforced concrete structures form the basis of the town's economy. The town is also a large railway traffic center.

Demographics

References

Notes

Sources

Cities and towns in Perm Krai
Populated places in Vereshchaginsky District
Populated places established in 1898